Putrescine aminotransferase (putrescine-alpha-ketoglutarate transaminase, YgjG, putrescine:alpha-ketoglutarate aminotransferase, PAT, putrescine:2-oxoglutarate aminotransferase, putrescine transaminase) is an enzyme with systematic name butane-1,4-diamine:2-oxoglutarate aminotransferase. This enzyme catalyses the following chemical reaction

 putrescine + 2-oxoglutarate  1-pyrroline + L-glutamate + H2O (overall reaction)
(1a) putrescine + 2-oxoglutarate  4-aminobutanal + L-glutamate
(1b) 4-aminobutanal  1-pyrroline + H2O (spontaneous)

This enzyme is a pyridoxal-phosphate protein.

References

External links 
 

EC 2.6.1